Honolulu Printmakers is a non-profit organization of Hawaii-based printmaking artists that operates a printing studio open to the community.  It conducts public exhibitions, lectures, demonstration, workshops, and an outreach program in local intermediate and high schools.  The organization holds an annual juried print exhibition.

The Honolulu Printmakers was established in 1928 by Charles W. Bartlett, John Melville Kelly, Huc-Mazelet Luquiens and Alexander Samuel MacLeod.  It has developed the tradition of the “gift print”, a print commissioned for sale as a fundraiser at the organization’s exhibitions.  The 75th anniversary of the organization was celebrated with a retrospective exhibition at the Honolulu Museum of Art and an accompanying catalogue, A Tradition of Gift Prints.

References
 Kam, Nadine, Communal Artists, Honolulu Printmakers has offered camaraderie to artists for 75 years, in Honolulu Star-Bulletin, March 16, 2003.
 Morse, Marcia, Honolulu printmakers 75th Anniversary, A Tradition of Gift Prints, Honolulu, HI, Honolulu Academy of Arts, 2003.

External links
 Honolulu Printmakers website

American printmakers
Arts organizations based in Hawaii
Printmakers from Hawaii
1928 establishments in Hawaii
Arts organizations established in 1928